Abandoned and Deceived is a 1995 American drama film written and directed by Joseph Dougherty. The film stars Lori Loughlin, Brian Kerwin, Farrah Forke, Eric Lloyd, Bibi Besch and Rosemary Forsyth. The film premiered on ABC on March 20, 1995.

Plot
The film is the story of a woman who is denied child support for her children by her ex-husband. Therefore she has to fight for her rights by appealing the courts of justice and the bureaucracy of the state, in the end helping other women do the same.

Cast 
Lori Loughlin as Gerri Jensen
Brian Kerwin as Doug
Farrah Forke as Sarah
Eric Lloyd as Matthew
Bibi Besch as Iris
Rosemary Forsyth as Judge
Ilene Graff
Robert Hooks as Doctor Peck
Claudette Nevins 		
Anthony Tyler Quinn as Gary
Amy Steel
Tyler Cole Malinger
Allison Dean	
Markus Flanagan		
Victoria Haas
Herb Mitchell	
Ben Siegler
Patti Yasutake	
Gordon Clapp as Donald Quinn
Linden Chiles as Gerri's Father
Shaun Duke as Quinn's Supervisor 
Tory Fairbrother as Judith
Connie Sawyer as Rose

References

External links
 

1995 television films
1995 films
American drama television films
1990s English-language films
1995 drama films
1990s American films